Quentin Tarantino (born 1963) is an American filmmaker.

Tarantino may also refer to:

Tarantino dialect, a transitional language associated with the Italian region of Apulia
Tarantino (surname)